Potliquor is the fourth album by American band Potliquor. It was released in 1979 and was their first album since 1973.

With no music released and/or seeing radio play since 1973, things were not looking very positive for the new lineup of Potliquor, now a three-man group composed of drummer Jerry Amoroso, bassist Guy Schaeffer, and guitarist Mike McQuaig. Amoroso flew to New York City to attempt to get a second chance at a recording contract, but to no avail. His disappointment led to the writing of "New York City You Ain't". Armed with a new song, Amoroso successfully negotiated a record deal with Capricorn Records early in 1977. With this new record label support, Potliquor released the song as a single in March 1977, but the lack of substantive airplay and sales scuttled plans for a new album.

It wasn't until 1979 when, free of their Capricorn Records contract, Potliquor went into Studio in the Country to record their fourth album, Potliquor. It had moderate success.

In a national feature "Pop Scene – Here's the Answer" provided by the United Feature Syndicate based in New York, New York, a newspaper reader from Santa Monica, California wrote in to inquire about Potliquor, having heard "Louisiana Lady", a single from the Potliquor album. The feature responded that "Capitol is giving the group new life, and is promoting them as if they were recently formed."

Track listing

Personnel
 Jerry Amoroso – drums, vocals, percussion
 Mike McQuaig – guitar
 Steve Sather – guitar, Vocals
 Guy Schaeffer – bass guitar, vocals

Additional musicians
 Rod Roddy (courtesy of Louisiana's LeRoux) – piano, clavinet, Oberheim synthesizer
 John Smith – saxophone solo on "Misery"
 Yolanda Nichols – background vocals on "Right Street / Wrong Direction" and "Misery"
 Charles Brent – string Arrangement on "Oh So Long"
 Charles Brent and John Smith – horn arrangements on "Misery", "Hey Mama", "Boy Oh Boy", "Liar"
 Jerry Amoroso and John Smith – horn arrangements on "Mr. President"
 String Quartet – Valerie Poullette, Michael Gyurik, Allen Nisbet, Jim Ummel
 Horn Section – Jon Smith, Charles Brent, Brian O'Neil, John Brem, Joe Woolie, Wade Smith

Production
 Bill Evans – producer, engineer
 Jerry Amoroso – co-producer

References

External links

1979 albums
Potliquor albums
Capitol Records albums
Albums recorded at Studio in the Country